Whitegrove or Warfield Green is a suburb of Bracknell in the English county of Berkshire. It stands within the bounds of the civil parish of Warfield.

Geography

Government
Electorally, Whitegrove comes under the Warfield Harvest Ride ward of Bracknell Forest Council. It falls within the Windsor parliamentary constituency.

Local amenities
Local amenities include Whitegrove Primary School and Whitegrove Library.

Whitegrove Football Club has over 360 children, boys and Girls, ranging from under 7's to under 17's playing in a number of local leagues.

On the northern edge of Whitegrove there is a local nature reserves called Hayley Green Wood.

References

-

Bracknell
Suburbs in the United Kingdom
Warfield